Dolly Akers (March 23, 1901 – June 5, 1986) was an Assiniboine woman who was the first Native American woman elected to the Montana Legislature with 100% of the Indian vote  and the first woman elected to the Tribal Executive Board of the Assiniboine and Sioux Tribes on the Fort Peck Indian Reservation.

Childhood and personal life

Dolly Smith Cusker Akers was born in Wolf Point, Montana to an Assiniboine tribal member Nellie Trexler and Irish-American William Smith. She grew up on the Fort Peck Reservation. As a teenager, she attended an Indian boarding school, the Sherman Institute in Riverside, California. After she graduated at age sixteen, she returned to Montana and married George Cusker in 1917. The couple ranched near Poplar and had one daughter, Alvina. George Cusker died in 1941 and in 1944, Dolly married John Akers. She was widowed a second time in 1959. In 1986 she died in Helena.

Political career

In 1920, Akers went to Washington D.C. to work as an interpreter for leaders of her tribe in their "dealings with the federal government." In 1923, Cusker accompanied two tribal representatives, Bear Hill and Dave Johnson, to Washington, D.C., as a translator to lobby for school funding. While there, she also advocated that Indians be given universal citizenship. The Indian Citizenship Act was passed in 1924. Not all Indians supported the passage of this act, which provided voting rights for Native Americans because they feared that it was another step toward assimilation and that it undermined tribal sovereignty.

Dolly's husband George Cusker served on the Tribal Council Executive Board; she often attended in his stead. Ultimately, she was appointed to the board in her own right. She was the first woman to gain this designation.

In 1932, Cusker was elected to the statehouse as a Democrat (she later became a Republican). She received almost 100 percent of the vote in Roosevelt County, which was a county that consisted majorly of white Americans. She became the first American Indian to serve in the Montana legislature, elected at just 23 years old, and was the only woman serving in the 1933-34 legislative session. She was appointed to the Federal Relations Committee and was a special representative of the governor to the U.S. Secretary of Interior.

Akers remained politically engaged for her entire life. She visited Washington, D.C., 57 times as a tribal delegate and was a member of the Fort Peck Tribal Council off and on for forty years. Her career was not without controversy. For example, in 1959, she was removed from the tribal council by a vote of 279 to 189 and "barred forever from holding office and representing the Fort Peck Sioux and Assiniboine tribes." That vote was later overturned.

Akers frequently challenged the Indian Bureau's management of tribal resources, believing that tribes (and individual Indians) should be permitted to manage their own affairs just as non-Indians could.  "Why should Indian people," she asked in 1952, "be forced to live under a law made some 80 years ago? That is the year in which the Indian Commissioner referred to Indians as 'wild beasts!'"

Elected to the Fort Peck Tribal Housing Authority in the 1970s, she advocated for funding for housing on the Fort Peck Reservation. She achieved her goal of receiving federal funds but was later accused by some members of the tribal council of favoring her supporters instead of weighing all applicants equally in the allocation of those housing funds. Akers lived on a 1400 acre ranch in Montana for part of her life where she served as an advocate and special advocate for seven different reservations in the state. Akers does a lot of work on awareness of the problems faced on reservations, especially regarding the youth, as she worked as a social worker for these seven reservations. Dolly personally sees these problems as a result of the up-bringing of native youths, as more and more parents are not teaching their children their heritage and native language to pass on.

Her belief in Indian autonomy led her to support the controversial policy of Termination, which advocated "terminating" the U.S. government's treaty obligations to tribes in order to encourage individual Indians to integrate into the larger Euro-American society. Looking back on her career, she was most proud of successfully lobbying for a regulation permitting tribes to hire their own legal counsel and the 1968 Indian Civil Rights Act, which placed Native Americans under the constitution.

Akers was also appointed into the Montana FHA advisory committee.

References

External links 
 Finding Aid for the Dolly Smith Cusker Akers Papers at the Montana Historical Society Research Center
http://montanawomenshistory.org/dolly-smith-cusker-akers-champion-to-some-foe-to-others/

1901 births
1986 deaths
20th-century American politicians
20th-century American women politicians
20th-century Native Americans
Assiniboine people
Democratic Party members of the Montana House of Representatives
Native American state legislators in Montana
Native American women in politics
People from Wolf Point, Montana
Women state legislators in Montana
20th-century Native American women
Fort Peck Assiniboine and Sioux Tribes people